South Park is a first-person shooter video game based on the American animated sitcom of the same name. The game was developed by Iguana Entertainment and published by Acclaim Entertainment for the Nintendo 64 in 1998 for North America and in 1999 for Europe. It was later ported to Microsoft Windows and  PlayStation (port developed by Appaloosa Interactive) in 1999 for the release year to coincide with the film South Park: Bigger, Longer & Uncut.

While the Nintendo 64 version's reception was fairly lukewarm, the PC and PlayStation versions of South Park were panned by critics. Acclaim later released South Park: Chef's Luv Shack in 1999 and South Park Rally in 2000.

Gameplay 
South Park is a first-person shooter. The game's single-player mode places the player in control of one of the four main characters of South Park (Cartman, Kyle, Stan or Kenny). The player must defeat a variety of enemies using the various weapons found throughout each stage in order to reach the exit point at the end.

In addition to completing levels, the player must also prevent large enemies in the stage (dubbed 'Tanks') from reaching the exit before they do. If they fail to do so, they will be forced to defend South Park from the 'Tanks' in a short minigame called the 'Penalty Round' after the stage.

Multiplayer 
In Head-to-Head mode, the players select a level, characters, and game style (time-limited, damage limited, or unending). The Microsoft Windows version allows for online head-to-head play.

In the PlayStation and Nintendo 64 versions, upon reaching select stages in single player mode, codes are revealed. These can then be input into the "Cheesy Poofs Decoder" to unlock additional characters for Head-to-Head play. All characters are unlocked in the Microsoft Windows version.

In the Nintendo 64 version, player can choose between 20 characters and 17 multiplayer levels.

Premise 
A mysterious comet is approaching the earth, described by the opening narration as a force of concentrated evil that no force of good can stand against. As it comes closer, South Park is beset by enemies, including rabid mutant turkeys, deformed clones of the townsfolk, alien visitors, berserk robots, and sentient killer toys. Stan, Kyle, Cartman and Kenny hear about the dangers from Chef, and take up arms to investigate their sources and defend the town.

Reception 

South Parks reception depended on the platform. Overall, the game was met with negative critical reception with the PC and PlayStation versions, while the Nintendo 64 version generally received mixed to positive reviews from critics. The PlayStation and PC versions received poor reception due to the bad graphics, poor visuals and bad voice acting. The Nintendo 64 version received the best reviews upon release. Aggregating review website GameRankings gave the Nintendo 64 version 67.11%, the PC version 51.72% and the PlayStation version 41.22%.

Next Generation reviewed the PC version of the game, rating it three stars out of five, and stated: "once the initial chuckles wear off, whether in multiplayer or single-player mode, you're left with a first-person shooter much like any other, and in fact, not as well-designed as most. It's as fun as the show it's based on, but its appeal is just as fleeting."

GameSpot gave the PlayStation version a 1.4/10, stating: "South Park is definitely one of those games that is bound to come up when you start thinking about the worst game you've ever played." IGN called the PlayStation version "frustrating" due to poor graphics, repetition of the voice acting, and lack of play value for the head-to-head mode. GameSpot stated of the PC version: "A good license and good graphics aren't enough." The voice acting, done by the original voice actors, was criticized for being repetitive, isolated, and old. The weapons of the game were also criticized for being unprofessional.

Despite the negative reception from the Windows and PlayStation versions, the Nintendo 64 version was praised for its 3D graphics and storyline, with IGN calling the game "just as funny as the Comedy Central series." GameSpot stated in the Nintendo 64 version that the level design was "really not very good on its own, but given the license, it at least makes sense."

Cancelled Game Boy Color port 
A Game Boy Color version developed by Crawfish Interactive was in development, but it was eventually cancelled due to South Park creators Matt Stone and Trey Parker stating that the game would not be fitting on the Game Boy Color as that console was marketed towards children. However, they did keep a few copies of the Game Boy Color version to commemorate what was originally started as the first South Park game. 

The game's engine and assets were reused for two additional Game Boy Color titles from Crawfish and Acclaim - Maya the Bee & Her Friends, based on the Maya the Bee franchise which was released in Europe, and The New Adventures of Mary-Kate and Ashley, based on Mary-Kate and Ashley Olsen and was released in North America, being one of the various video games based on the duo.

In 2018, a ROM image of the Game Boy Color version was leaked online by someone who had contacted ex-developers at Crawfish.

Sequel 
A spiritual sequel in the style of a sandbox action-adventure game was in development for the PlayStation 2, GameCube and Xbox, but was not finished. Little was known about the game until a build was found on an Xbox development kit, but only video footage of the beta build has been released to the public. The footage appears to showcase the PlayStation 2 version, due to the visual button displays used in the game. A cutscene from the game was even leaked on YouTube showing Cartman in a mental hospital.

References 

1998 video games
Acclaim Entertainment games
Appaloosa Interactive games
Cancelled Dreamcast games
Cancelled Game Boy Color games
First-person shooters
Multiplayer and single-player video games
Nintendo 64 games
PlayStation (console) games
Video games based on South Park
Video games developed in Hungary
Video games set in Colorado
Windows games
Video games developed in the United States